Sally Davis (born 1975/1976), known professionally as Sally Bretton, is an English actress. She is best known for appearing as Lucy Adams in the long-running BBC television sitcom Not Going Out since 2007, and as Martha Lloyd in the BBC1 crime drama Death in Paradise between 2016 and 2017, a role she reprised in the spin-off Beyond Paradise in 2023.

She has featured in the TV programmes Absolute Power, Green Wing and The Office. In 2008, she played Goneril in Shakespeare's King Lear at Shakespeare's Globe.

Early life 
Bretton trained in London at the Central School of Speech and Drama, and worked as a drama teacher at Top Hat Stage and Screen School. She chose the professional name Bretton as a Sally Davis was already registered with actors' union Equity.

Personal life 
Bretton and her husband, Lee, a photographer, have three daughters. She grew up in a small town in Hertfordshire and as of 2015 resided near Hitchin, Hertfordshire.

Filmography

Film

Television

Theatre

Radio

Awards 
 Nominated
 2002 – Manchester Evening News Theatre AwardsBest Actress (Theatre) – Who's Afraid of Virginia Woolf?

References

External links 
 

Living people
Alumni of the Royal Central School of Speech and Drama
English film actresses
English radio actresses
English stage actresses
English television actresses
English Shakespearean actresses
Drama teachers
21st-century English actresses
Year of birth missing (living people)
20th-century English actresses